Snooker world rankings 1998/1999: The professional world rankings for the top 64 snooker players in the 1998–99 season are listed below.

References

1998
Rankings 1999
Rankings 1998